Movietone may refer to:

Movietone (band), a Bristol-based British music group
Movietone News, a company producing cinema newsreels from the 1920s onwards
Movietone Records, a budget subsidiary of 20th Century Fox' record division
The Movietone sound system for recording synchronised sound onto film